Alice & Smith is a Canadian transmedia storytelling and video game developer that specializes in alternate reality games.

Initially founded by Nathalie Lacoste and Andrea Doyon to create The Secret World spin-off The Black Watchmen, the company also created ARGs for games such as No Man's Sky and Vampire: The Masquerade – Bloodlines 2.

Games
The Black Watchmen (2015)
Ahnayro: The Dream World (2016)
NITE Team 4 (2019)
Cyrano Story (2020)

Alternate reality games
Waking Titan (2017)
Tender (2019)

Awards

References

External links

Transmedia storytelling
Video game development companies
Technology companies of Canada